Crystal Kathy Melissa Haynes is a Barbadian politician who has been a member of the Senate of Barbados since January 2018 and January 2022 respectively. She is a member of the First senate of Barbados constituted after Barbados became a republic by Prime Minister Mia Mottley. She is a member of the Barbados Labour Party.

References 

Living people
Barbadian politicians
Members of the Senate of Barbados
Barbados Labour Party politicians
Year of birth missing (living people)